Danijel Vuletić (best known as Daniel Vuletic, born July 5, 1970) is an Italian composer and producer.

Biography
Vuletic was born in Zagreb (Croatia) and has lived and worked in Milan, Italy since 1993. Vuletic has produced and written for numerous Italian, Spanish and English speaking performers including Laura Pausini, Andrea Bocelli, Luis Fonsi, Nicky Jam, Wisin, Nek, Luciano Pavarotti, Adriano Celentano, Mina, Zucchero, James Blunt, Juanes, Gianna Nannini, Gianni Morandi, Malika Ayane, Marco Carta just to name a few.

In 1993, Vuletic, seeking his childhood idol, world-renowned producer Celso Valli, left Croatia for Italy. Valli had produced Eros Ramazzotti and Andrea Bocelli and a long list of other talented artists. After years of living in Milan and playing in European clubs his dream of meeting Valli is realized. Valli heard five of his songs; so impressed by the songs Valli decides to produce Vuletic on the spot.

Career and awards
 2005 Grammy Award: Album "Escucha" Laura Pausini
 2005 Latin Grammy Award: Album "Escucha" Laura Pausini
 2007 Latin Grammy Award: Album "Yo Canto" Laura Pausini
 2009 Latin Grammy Award: Album "Primavera Anticipada" Laura Pausini
 2003, 2006, 2006, 2007, 2010 Latin ASCAP Award
 2006, 2010, 2015 Lo Nuestro Award
 2003, 2007, 2010 World Music Awards
 2018 Latin Grammy Award for the best Pop Traditional Album "Hazte Sentir" Laura Pausini
 2018 November 10 1 on Billboard 200 "Sì" Andrea Bocelli

In 1998, Vuletic signed a contract with Sony Italy as a singer, and Valli recorded the album between Italy and Los Angeles. The first single was "Imparando (A Stare Senza Te)", starring Martina Stella, one of the most popular Italian actresses at the time.

On stage at his first concert in Riccione Italy, Vuletic decided to write songs rather than perform them and immediately shares this self-revelation with Valli; together they scrapped the album opting instead to release 3 singles. Laura Pausini having heard his single on the radio met Vuletic and the pair began their collaboration and in 2000 they worked on their first album together, "Entre Tu y Mil Mares".

A year later, Vuletic wrote "Volveré Junto a Ti" and "Dos Historias Iguales" the top 2 singles in the album "The Best of Laura Pausini" which reached 7,000,000 copies in sales. "Volveré Junto a Ti" gave Vuletic his first ASCAP award.

In 2002, his collaboration with Nek started with the album "Las cosas que Defendere" writing the single "Hablamos en Pasado" among others.

The album "Escucha" was released in 2004 and was a hit, winning in 2005 the Grammy Award as the "Best Latin Pop Album" and Latin Grammy for "Best Female Pop Vocal album". Vuletic wrote "Escucha Atento", "Como si No Nos Hubieramos Amado", "Mi perspectiva", "Tu Nombre en Mayusculas", "Hablame" in this album. "Como si No Nos Hubieramos Amado" gave him the second ASCAP award.

"Yo Canto" was released in 2006 and Vuletic arranged and produced 3 songs in that album: "Destino Paraiso", "Disparame Dispara", and "Mi Libre Cancion" (Duet with Juanes). "Yo Canto" won the Latin Grammy for "Best Female Pop Vocal Album".
 
In 2008, the album "Primavera Anticipada", Vuletic wrote "Primavera Anticipada" (Duet with James Blunt), "Del Modo Mas Sincero", "Un Hecho Obvio", "Mis Beneficios", "Mas que Ayer", "La Impresion", "Hermana Tierra". In 2009, "Primavera Anticipada" won the Latin Grammy for "Best Female Pop Vocal Album".

In the "Laura Live World Tour" in 2009 it toured with 3 singles written by Vuletic: "Con la Musica en la Radio", "Menos Mal" and "Ella no Soy".

In 2009 Vuletic signed with Sugar Publishing.

In 2011 the album "Inedito", Vuletic wrote, arranged and produced the songs: "Inedito" (Duet with Gianna Nannini), "Cada uno juega su partida", "Te digo adios" and "Como vives tu sin mi".

In November 2015 in New York City, Vuletic became the first Italian composer to sign a contract with a US publisher, Sony/ATV Music Publishing.

In 2018 Vuletic wrote "Ave Maria pietas" for Andrea Bocelli's new album Sì. There is a duet version of "Ave Maria pietas" with the famous russian soprano Aida Garifullina.

In 2019 "Ave Maria pietas" will be the Soundtrack of "Fatima", USA movie directed by Marco Pontecorvo, starring Harvey Keitel

Selected discography

Albums 
 2000 - Entre Tu y Mil Mares - Laura Pausini
 2001 - The Best of Laura Pausini: Volveré Junto a Ti - Laura Pausini
 2002 - Las Cosas que Defenderè - Nek
 2002 - L'Amore ci Cambia La Vita - Gianni Morandi
 2003 - Ti Adoro - Luciano Pavarotti
 2004 - Escucha - Laura Pausini
 2005 - C'è Sempre un Motivo - Adriano Celentano
 2005 - Bula Bula - Mina
 2005 - Live in Paris - Laura Pausini
 2006 - Yo Canto - Laura Pausini
 2007 - Dormi Amore, la Situazione non è Buona - Adriano Celentano
 2007 . San Siro 2007 - Laura Pausini
 2008 - Primavera Anticipada - Laura Pausini
 2008 - All the Lost Souls - DeLuxe Edition -  James Blunt
 2009 - Laura Live World Tour 09 - Laura Pausini
 2009 - La Forza Mia - Marco Carta
 2010 - Libera Nel Mondo - Enrico Nigiotti
 2011 - Inedito - Laura Pausini
 2012 . Ricreazione - Malika Ayane
 2013 - 20 - The Greatest Hits - Laura Pausini
 2015 - Simili - Laura Pausini
 2018 - Fatti sentire - Laura Pausini
 2018 - Sì - Andrea Bocelli
 2019 -  - Zucchero

References

1970 births
Living people
Italian composers
Musicians from Zagreb
Croatian emigrants to Italy